Thora Sa Aasman  is a 2016 Pakistani television series based on the novel of the same name written by Umera Ahmed. The serial is directed by "Nadeem Siddiqui" and produced by Hassan Zia under the banner of "Mastermind Productions".

Cast 
Yasra Rizvi as Fatima Mukhtar
Zeba Bakhtiyar as Shaista Kamal, Haroon's wife
Ushna Shah as Rakhshi
Lubna Aslam as Muneeza, Mansoor's wife
Aly Khan as Haroon Kamal
Seher Afzal as Amber, Mansoor's first daughter 
Sheen Javed as Zarka
Babar Ali as Mansoor 
Qaiser Nizamani as Baqir Sheerazi
Kaif Ghaznavi as Saiqa, Rakhshi's mother
Alizey Tahir as Safiya, Mansoor's second daughter 
Shaheen Khan as Ammi
Sabahat Ali Bukhari as Aapa
Qazi Wajid as Shaista's father
Parveen Akbar as Asghari Bi
Fauzia Mushtaq as Fatima's mother
Tauqeer Ahmed as Roshan, Mansoor's son
Hareb Farooq as Shaheer
Malik Raza as Fatima's brother
Anwar Iqbal as Masood
Omair Leghari as Talha
Jahanzeb Khan as Osama
Jia Shahid
Adnan Jilani as Zafar
Imran Ashraf as Samar
Naeem Malik as Azhar
Kausar Siddiqui as Aasiya
Mehboob Sultan
Khushi Maheen as Young Rakshi

See also
 Geo TV
 List of Pakistani television series
 List of programs broadcast by Geo Entertainment

References

External links

 
A&B Entertainment
2016 Pakistani television series debuts